In Mandaeism, the World of Darkness is the underworld located below Tibil (Earth). It is ruled by its king Ur (Leviathan) and its queen Ruha, mother of the seven planets and twelve constellations.

Description
The great dark Ocean of Sup (or Suf) lies in the World of Darkness. The great dividing river of Hitpun, analogous to the river Styx in Greek mythology, separates the World of Darkness from the World of Light. Siniawis is one of the regions of the World of Darkness.

The Ginza Rabba mention the Abaddons as part of the World of Darkness. The Right Ginza mentions the existence of the "upper Abaddons" as well as the "lower Abaddons".

The World of Darkness is sometimes referred to as Sheol in the Ginza Rabba and other Mandaean scriptures.

Inhabitants

Various beings inhabit the World of Darkness.

See also
Sheol
Ancient Mesopotamian underworld

References

Mandaean cosmology
Conceptions of hell
Underworld
Darkness